Grand Prix 4, commonly known as GP4 is a Formula One racing simulator game co-developed by Geoff Crammond's development studio Simergy and Infogrames' Chippenham development studio, and published by Infogrames. Released for the PC on June 21, 2002, and is the last entry in Crammond's Grand Prix series, and the last entry released under the MicroProse label. Based on the 2001 Formula One season, GP4 is a huge graphical and physics upgrade from the previous version, Grand Prix 3 which had been released in 2000.

Modifications from version 3 
Grand Prix 4 featured a heavily revised graphics engine and updated physics, including wet weather driving:
 While it is possible to play the game on a LAN, multiplayer internet gameplay was not possible, due to licensing restrictions. Some individuals managed to circumvent this limitation later using the Free Tunngle Network.
 The locked framerate and CPU-heavy graphics were still a big issue with the series despite a completely revised graphics engine. However, the graphics engine proved to be very scalable, supporting models and textures multiple times the detail of the original shipped materials.
 The mod community faced similar frustrations with the track format and it took fully two years before the track format was truly "cracked". The first add-on tracks to be released for the game included Shanghai, Istanbul and Jerez.
 When the game was initially launched, it had a large number of bugs. Many of these were addressed by a patch which was later included with the retail game, though the project was canned when Microprose closed and no further official fixes were forthcoming. To compensate for this, some third party programmers addressed some of the remaining problems, and included enhancements which allowed the game to follow the updated rules of the Formula One championship.

Although the game could be considered a relatively modest commercial success, the chances of a further entry to the series could be considered slim to none because MicroProse's parent company Infogrames dissolved the developer shortly after the game's release. In addition, the Sony Computer Entertainment brand's exclusive licensing deal for Formula One games rules out an update with official stats. An Xbox port of the title had been planned for release in late 2002, before being cancelled in October that same year.

Reception 

Grand Prix 4 received "generally favorable reviews" according to the review aggregation website Metacritic.

The game won the award in the Sports category at the British Academy of Film and Television Arts Awards in 2002. It was also nominated for Computer Gaming Worlds 2002 "Sports Game of the Year" award, which ultimately went to Madden NFL 2003. The editors called Grand Prix 4 "one of the better racing games in years past". It was also a runner-up for GameSpots annual "Best Driving Game on PC" award, losing to Rally Trophy.

References

External links

GP4 Central - A fan site
Grand Prix Games - The Community Place - A fan forum
GP4 Forever - A fan forum
Gp4 International - Italian Community of  Grand Prix 4
Gp4 International - Italian Community Gp4 International main forum
Support forum Gp4 International - Italian Community Gp4 International 
Gp4 Sprintrace creators and inventors of Gp4 Sprint Race - Gp4 Sprintrace 

2002 video games
Cancelled Dreamcast games
Cancelled Xbox games
Infogrames games
Formula One video games
MicroProse games
Multiplayer and single-player video games
Racing simulators
Video games scored by James Hannigan
Video games developed in the United Kingdom
Windows games
Windows-only games

de:Grand Prix (Computerspiel)#Grand Prix 4
BAFTA Interactive Entertainment Award for Best Games winners